Drifting (a.k.a. Nagu'a) is the title of an independent film directed by Amos Guttman. Filmed in 1982 and released commercially a year later, it is one of the first Israeli LGBT-themed films, and follows a lonely young gay man as he attempts to find love and break into the movie business.  The film is in Hebrew. Sometimes the film's title is translated as Afflicted.

Cast
Jonathan Sagall as Robi
 as Han
Ben Levin as Ezri
Dita Arel as Rachel 
Boaz Torjemann as Baba
 as Robi's father

Plot
Robi (Jonathan Sagall) is a young Israeli who lives with his grandparents and works at their store. He dreams of finding true love and becoming a movie director, both of which seem increasingly difficult.  His film career stalls, until he can get financial backing and his love life seems to be in similar shape. While the city has places to cruise for sex, Robi struggles to find an organized gay community and a committed relationship.

His grandparents tolerate his homosexuality, preferring to ignore the men he brings home and avoid asking why he regularly visits the park. Yet, they view his sexual orientation as being shameful not only to him, but to the entire family. When upset, his grandmother yells at him, and asks when he is going to find a nice woman, marry and start a family. His ex-girlfriend would love to get back together, but Robi has fallen in love with a man named Han, who caved into the social pressure and married a woman.

References

External links

PopcornQ:Drifting
New York Times Film Review

1982 LGBT-related films
Israeli LGBT-related films
Films directed by Amos Guttman
Gay-related films
LGBT-related drama films
Israeli drama films
1982 drama films
1980s Hebrew-language films